The Vishnu Temple, Bhubaneswar is a Hindu temple dedicated to Lord Vishnu situated on the eastern embankment of Bindu Sagar at Talabazar, on the right side of the Talabazar road leading from Lingaraj temple to  Kedara-Gouri lane in Bhubaneswar, the capital of Odisha, India. The temple faces west and the Sanctum is used for storage purposes. The sculptural embellishment on the outer wall and the parsavadevatas in raha niche suggests that the temple was originally dedicated to Vishnu.

The Temple
The temple is estimated to have built during the 12th century AD with Rekha deul topology.

 Surrounding: The Temple is surrounded by Bindusagara tank in the west at a distance of 8.00 metres across the road, Ananta Vasudeva Temple in the north at a distance of 10.00 metres, Ananta Vasudev bhogamandapa in the east at a distance of 1.00 metres and local shops in the south.

Architecture
The talajangha is carved with a series of khakhara mundi pilasters and bandhana has three mouldings without any carvings. The upara jangha is carved with a series of pidhamundi. The baranda has five mouldings and Gandi is plain except udyota simha in the central raha and dopichha simha at the above the kanika paga.

The doorjambs are carved with three vertical bands of puspa sakha, nara sakha and lata sakha. At the base of the jambs there are two  pidha mundi dvarapala niches that house unusual kind of doorkeepers of male and female figures. At the lalatabimba there is a Gajalaxmi panel sitting in  lalitasana over a lotus pedestal. While her left hand is holding lotus the right hand is in varada mudra. The deity is flanked by two full blown lotuses.  Inside the Sanctum, the eastern wall is carved with two large sized pidha mundi niches, which was originally enshrining the presiding deity, which is now missing.

Bibliography
 Lesser Known Monuments of Bhubaneswar by Dr. Sadasiba Pradhan

See also
 List of temples in Bhubaneswar

External links
 Vishnu Temple - Bhubaneswar - Bada 

Hindu temples in Bhubaneswar
Vishnu temples
12th-century Hindu temples